Mariana Starke (1761/2–1838) was an English author. She is best known for her travel guide to France and Italy which served as a popular companion for British travellers to the Continent in the early nineteenth century. She also wrote plays and poetry early in her career but was discouraged by harsh reviews. She was unmarried but sometimes referred to as Mrs. Starke, as was common at the time.

Life and writing career
Starke's mother was Mary (née Hughes) and her father was Richard Starke, governor of Fort St George in Madras (now known as Chennai). Starke grew up in India and used that country as a background for her plays The Sword of Peace and The Widow of Malabar. Starke subsequently lived in Italy for an extended period, between 1792 and 1798, to attend a sick relation, and this experience formed the basis for her later writing. After the end of the Napoleonic Wars, Starke returned to Italy and devoted the rest of her life to continual revisions of her travel series, effectively reinventing the genre.

Earlier travel guides traditionally concentrated on architectural and scenic descriptions of the places to be visited by wealthy young men on the Grand Tour. Starke recognised that with the enormous growth in the number of Britons travelling abroad after 1815, the majority of her readers would now be travelling in family groups and often on a budget. She therefore included for the first time a wealth of advice on luggage, obtaining passports, the precise cost of food and accommodation in each city, and even advice on the care of invalid family members. She also devised a system of exclamation mark [!!!] ratings, a forerunner of today's star classifications.

Her books, published by John Murray, served as a template for later guides. Her work earned her celebrity status in her lifetime. The French author Stendhal, in his 1839 novel The Charterhouse of Parma, refers to a travelling British historian who "never paid for the smallest trifle without first looking up its price in the Travels of a certain Mrs Starke, a book which...indicates to the prudent Englishman the cost of a turkey, an apple, a glass of milk and so forth".

Works

Plays
 The British Orphan (unpublished; produced privately in 1791)
 The Sword of Peace; or, a Voyage of Love (produced in London in 1788; Etext)
 The Widow of Malabar. A tragedy in three acts (adaptation from La Veuve de Malabar by Le Mierre; produced in London in 1790)
 The Tournament, a tragedy; imitated from the celebrated German drama, entitled Agnes Bernauer (produced in 1800)

Poetry
 The Poor Soldier; an American tale: founded on a recent fact. Attributed; two editions: London: Printed for J. Walter, 1789
 The Beauties of Carlo Maria Maggi, paraphrased: to which are added Sonnets, by Mariana Starke Exeter: Printed for the author, by S. Woolmer ... and sold by Longman, Hurst, Rees, and Orme, London ; by Upham, and also by Barratt, Bath, 1811

Travel writing
 Letters from Italy, between the years 1792 and 1798 containing a view of the Revolutions in that country (2 vols. London, 1800)
  v.2
 Travels on the Continent: written for the use and particular information of travellers (1820)
 
 Information and Directions for Travellers on the Continent (1824; a new version of the 1820 Travellers; expanded and republished as Travels in Europe for the use of Travellers on the Continent and likewise in the Island of Sicily, to which is added an account of the Remains of Ancient Italy in 1832) (658 p; 2 maps)
Various translations of the above and pirated editions; last edition issued was in 1839
 . Index

References 
 Baigent, Elizabeth (2007). "Starke, Mariana (1761/2 – 1838)." Oxford Dictionary of National Biography. Ed. H. C. G. Matthew and Brian Harrison. Oxford: OUP, 2004. 6 January 2007
 --[?]-- (1990) "Starke, Mariana, 1762?–1838." The Feminist Companion to Literature in English. Virginia Blain et al., eds. New Haven and London: Yale University Press; p. 1023

External links 
 O'Quinn, Daniel J. "The Long Minuet as Danced at Coromandel: Character and the Colonial Translation of Class Anxiety in Mariana Starke's The Sword of Peace." British Women Playwrights around 1800. 1 September 2000. 27 pars.
 Purinton, Marjean. "Response to Daniel J. O'Quinn's Essay: Dancing and Dueling in Mariana Starke's Comedy." British Women Playwrights around 1800. 1 September 2000. 13 pars.
 Robinson, Terry F. "Mariana Starke." The Literary Encyclopedia. 29 January 2008.
 Starke, Mariana. The Sword of Peace; or, a Voyage of Love. Eds. Thomas C. Crochunis and Michael Eberle-Sinatra, with an introduction by Jeanne Moskal and a headnote by Jeffrey N. Cox. British Women Playwrights around 1800. 15 August 1999.

English dramatists and playwrights
British women dramatists and playwrights
English women non-fiction writers
18th-century British women writers
18th-century British writers
19th-century English women writers
19th-century British writers
British women travel writers
1762 births
1838 deaths
English travel writers
18th-century English women
18th-century English people